Cayeye is a Colombian cuisine dish made from mashed green guineos, a type of green bananas. It is mainly eaten for breakfast. Cayeye is from the coastal region of Magdalena, Colombia including Ciénaga, Zona Bananera, Santa Marta, Fundación and Aracataca.

References

Additional sources 
 MORÓN, Carlos y GALVÁN, Cristina. La cocina criolla. Recetas de Córdoba y regiones de la costa Caribe. Domus Libri: 1996. p. 182.Colombian cuisine
Banana dishes